Murtaza Wahab is a Pakistani politician who is the current Adviser to Chief Minister of Sindh on Rules and regulations. He was a member of the Senate of Pakistan from August 2017 to March 2018.

Political career

On 30 April 2015, he was inducted into the provincial Sindh cabinet of Chief Minister Syed Murad Ali Shah and was appointed as adviser to the Chief Minister on law. On 21 May 2015, he was given the status of minister.

A petition was filed in the High Court of Sindh challenging the appointment of Wahab as adviser to the Chief Minister and the granting of minister's status to Wahab. The petitioner argued that Wahab became an advocate of the High Court of Sindh in June 2010, and therefore have experience of only six years. The petitioner also challenged the appointment of Wahab as chairman of the Board of Governors of law colleges in Karachi, saying that only provincial minister of Education or the vice-chancellor of the University of Karachi can be appointed for the post.

On 22 November 2016, The High Court of Sindh declared his appointment as advisor to the Chief Minister of Sindh as illegal. The court also nullified his chairmanship of the Board of Governors of law colleges in Karachi.

He was elected unopposed to the Senate of Pakistan as a candidate of Pakistan Peoples Party (PPP) on 15 August 2017. The seat had fallen vacant after the resignation of Saeed Ghani. His Senate membership was due to expire on 11 March 2018.

He ran for the seat in Sindh Provincial Assembly as a candidate of PPP from Constituency PS-111 (Karachi South-V) in 2018 Pakistani general election but was unsuccessful. He received 8,502 votes and lost the seat to Imran Ismail.

On 19 August 2018, he was inducted into the provincial Sindh cabinet of Chief Minister Syed Murad Ali Shah. On 21 August, he was appointed as adviser to Chief Minister on law, and Anti-Corruption Establishment. On 5 September 2018, he was given the additional portfolio of information.

On 5 August 2021, he was appointed as Administrator of Karachi.

Personal life 
He is the son of famous PPP politician Fauzia Wahab and went to BVS Parsi High School, Karachi.

References

Living people
Pakistan People's Party politicians
Year of birth missing (living people)